Stefan Ledóchowski, Szaława coat of arms (died 1732), was Volhynian Podstoli in the years 1720–1727.

In 1729 he was member of parliament in Volhynian Voivodeship in Polish–Lithuanian Commonwealth.

Bibliography 
 Urzędnicy wołyńscy XIV-XVIII wieku. Spisy. Oprac. Marian Wolski, Kórnik 2007, page 170.
 Teka Gabryela Junoszy Podoskiego, volume III, Poznań 1856, page 303.

Stefan
Year of birth unknown
1732 deaths